Garton railway station was a railway station on the Malton & Driffield Railway (MDR) in the East Riding of Yorkshire, England. It opened on 19 May 1853, and served the village of Garton-on-the-Wolds. It closed on 5 June 1950.

Garton was the least important station on the MDR, handling fewer passengers than any other.

References

Sources

External links
 Garton station on navigable 1947 O. S. map
Garton station at The Yorkshire Wolds Railway Restoration Project

Disused railway stations in the East Riding of Yorkshire
Former Malton and Driffield Junction Railway stations
Railway stations in Great Britain opened in 1853
Railway stations in Great Britain closed in 1950